"I Guess I'll Miss the Man" is a song written by Stephen Schwartz and released as a single by Motown singing group The Supremes in 1972 from their album The Supremes Produced and Arranged by Jimmy Webb. Contrary to the album's title, the song was produced by Sherlie Matthews and Deke Richards. It peaked at 17 on Billboard's Adult Contemporary chart and 85 on the Hot 100.

The song has appeared in the musical Pippin since its original Broadway introduction in 1972 (as it was partially financed by Motown at the time), and is sung by the show's character Catherine.

Charts

Personnel
Lead vocals by Jean Terrell
Background vocals by Mary Wilson and Lynda Laurence

References

1972 singles
1972 songs
The Supremes songs
Motown singles
Songs written by Stephen Schwartz (composer)